Henderson County is a county in the U.S. state of Texas. As of the 2020 census, its population was 82,150. The county seat is Athens. The county is named in honor of James Pinckney Henderson, the first attorney general of the Republic of Texas, and secretary of state for the republic. He later served as the first governor of Texas. Henderson County was established in 1846, the year after Texas gained statehood. Its first town was Buffalo, laid out in 1847. The county boundaries were set in 1850, with some reduction from the previous size. The restructuring resulted in the need for a new county seat. In an election, Athens was chosen as the site for the "courthouse under the oaks." Henderson County comprises the Athens micropolitan statistical area, which is also included in the Dallas-Fort Worth combined statistical area.

Geography

Major highways
  U.S. Highway 175
  State Highway 19
  State Highway 31
  State Highway 155
  State Highway 198
  State Highway 274
  State Highway 334

Adjacent counties
 Kaufman County (north)
 Van Zandt County (north)
 Smith County (east)
 Cherokee County (southeast)
 Anderson County (south)
 Freestone County (southwest)
 Navarro County (west)
 Ellis County (northwest)

Communities

Cities

 Athens (county seat)
 Brownsboro
 Chandler
 Eustace
 Gun Barrel City
 Log Cabin
 Malakoff
 Moore Station
 Murchison
 Seven Points (small part in Kaufman County)
 Star Harbor
 Tool
 Trinidad

Towns

 Berryville
 Caney City
 Coffee City
 Enchanted Oaks
 Mabank (mostly in Kaufman County)
 Payne Springs
 Poynor

Census-designated place
 Sunrise Shores

Unincorporated communities

 Aley
 Antioch
 Baxter
 Bethel
 Big Rock
 Buffalo
 Crescent Heights
 Cross Roads
 Dauphin
 Evelyn
 Fincastle
 Harmony
 LaRue
 Leagueville
 Mankin
 New Hope
 Opelika
 Pauline
 Pickens
 Pine Grove
 Ruth Springs
 Shady Oaks
 Stockard
 Sumer Hill
 Union Hill
 Virginia Hill

Ghost towns
 Centreville
 Corinth

Demographics

Note: the US Census treats Hispanic/Latino as an ethnic category. This table excludes Latinos from the racial categories and assigns them to a separate category. Hispanics/Latinos can be of any race.

As of the census of 2000, 73,277 people, 28,804 households, and 20,969 families were residing in the county. Its population density was 84 people/sq mi (32/km2). The 35,935 housing units averaged 41 per sq mi (16/km2). The racial makeup of the county was 88.50% White, 6.61% African American, 0.54% Native American, 0.30% Asian,  2.75% from other races, and 1.30% from two or more races. About 6.92% of the population was Hispanic or Latino of any race. At the 2020 census, its population increased to 82,150 with a predominantly non-Hispanic white population; the Hispanic or Latino population of any race increased to 13.68% reflecting nationwide demographic trends.

Government
 County Judge: Wade McKinney
 Commissioner Pct. 1: Wendy Spivey
 Commissioner Pct. 2: Scott Tuley
 Commissioner Pct. 3: Charles "Chuck" McHam
 Commissioner Pct. 4: Mark Richardson
 County Clerk: Mary Margret Wright
 District Clerk: Betty Herriage
 County Attorney: Clint Davis
 District Attorney: Jenny Palmer
 County Auditor: Ann Marie Lee
 County Treasurer: Michael Bynum
 County Court at Law #1 Judge: Scott Williams
 County Court at Law #2 Judge: Nancy Perryman
 3rd District Court Judge: Mark Calhoon
 173rd District Court Judge: Dan Moore
 392nd District Court Judge: Scott McKee
 Justice of the Peace Pct. 1: Randy Daniel
 Constable Pct. 1: Thomas Goodell
 Justice of the Peace Pct. 2: Kevin Pollock
 Constable Pct. 2: Mitch Baker
 Justice of the Peace Pct. 3:  James Duncan
 Constable Pct. 3: David Grubbs
 Justice of the Peace Pct. 4: Milton Adams
 Constable Pct. 4: John Floyd
 Justice of the Peace Pct. 5: Belinda Brownlow
 Constable Pct. 5: Brad Miers
 Sheriff: Botie Hillhouse
 Tax Assessor/Collector: Peggy Goodall
 Elections Administrator: Paula Ludtke
 Fire Marshal/Emergency Management Coordinator: Shane Renburg

Politics

Media
Henderson County is part of the Dallas/Fort Worth DMA. Local media outlets are: KDFW-TV, KXAS-TV, WFAA-TV, KTVT-TV, KERA-TV, KTXA-TV, KDFI-TV, KDAF-TV, and KFWD-TV. Other nearby stations that provide coverage for Henderson County come from the Tyler/Longview/Jacksonville market and they include: KLTV, KTRE-TV, KYTX-TV, KFXK-TV, KCEB-TV, and KETK-TV.

Newspaper coverage of the area can be found in the Athens Daily Review, based in Athens; The Monitor is published in Mabank, which is primarily in Kaufman County, but also covers news in parts of Henderson County, as well.

Crime
Paul Knight of the Houston Press said in a 2009 article that some people blamed the development of the artificial Cedar Creek Lake, which opened in 1965, and development of the area surrounding the lake for the initial influx of crime and recreational drugs into the county and the East Texas region. Carroll Dyson, a retired pilot and Henderson County resident interviewed by the Houston Press, said in 2009 that the lake attracted "white flight" from metropolitan areas. Dyson added, "When all your rich people from Dallas and Houston move out here, the thieves are just drawn to them. Thieves are just wired that way. You used to not have to lock your door in Henderson County." Ray Nutt, the sheriff of Henderson County, said in the same article that when the lake first opened, it had no zoning and "a lot of elderly people bought a mobile home and moved in; it was nice. Then, they passed away and family members sold them off or just let them go down." Nutt added that the area around the lake has "a lot of good people," yet it also where "a lot of criminals tend to flow."

See also

 National Register of Historic Places listings in Henderson County, Texas
 Recorded Texas Historic Landmarks in Henderson County
 Clay Smothers

References

External links
 Henderson County
 Henderson County in Handbook of Texas Online at the University of Texas
 TXGenWeb Project for Henderson County

 
Dallas–Fort Worth metroplex
1846 establishments in Texas
Populated places established in 1846
Micropolitan areas of Texas